Global Business Network (GBN) was a leading consulting firm that specialized in helping organizations to adapt and grow in an uncertain and volatile world. The firm was particularly well known for using tools such as scenario planning and also offered experiential learning with networks of experts and futurists (dubbed "Remarkable People", or RPs).

GBN advised businesses, non-profits and governments on how to address critical challenges and anticipate possible trends that could shape the future.

Originally an independent firm, GBN became part of the Monitor Group in 2000, which was then in turn acquired by Deloitte. GBN was based in San Francisco, and had offices in New York City, London, and Cambridge, Massachusetts.

History
GBN was founded in Berkeley, California, in 1987 by a group of entrepreneurs including Peter Schwartz, Jay Ogilvy, Stewart Brand, Napier Collyns, and Lawrence Wilkinson. The company grew to include a core group of "practice members", and over a hundred individual network members (or "RPs") from a range of different fields, such as Wired editor Kevin Kelly, social media expert Clay Shirky, anthropologist Mary Catherine Bateson, economist Aidan Eyakuze, musician Brian Eno, biotechnologist Rob Carlson, and China scholar Orville Schell.

For its first 15 years, corporate clients would pay an annual subscription of up to $40,000 to become members of GBN's "Worldview". In return, they received exposure to the network of experts, were invited to workshops and interactive meetings to explore emerging trends and alternative futures, while gaining access to training seminars, a private website, and the GBN Book Club, offering a selection of literature about future issues each month. After its acquisition by Monitor in 2000, GBN soon stopped offering this membership service, concentrating instead on scenario-based consulting and training.

Before GBN, Peter Schwartz had been employed at SRI International as director of the Strategic Environment Center; following that, he took a position as head of scenario planning at Royal Dutch/Shell, from 1982 to 1986, where he continued the pioneering work of Pierre Wack in the field of scenario planning.

GBN ceased to be an active entity following the acquisition of the Monitor Group by Deloitte in January 2013.

Scenario planning
Unlike forecasting which extrapolates past and present trends to predict the future, scenario planning is a process for exploring alternative, plausible, possible futures and what those might mean for strategies, policies, and decisions. Scenario planning was first used by the military in World War II and then by Herman Kahn at RAND (“Thinking the Unthinkable”) during the Cold War, before being adapted to inform corporate strategy by Pierre Wack and other business strategists at Royal Dutch/Shell in the 1970s. The key principles of scenario planning include thinking from the outside in about the forces in the contextual environment that are driving change, engaging multiple perspectives to identify and interpret those forces, and adopting a long view.

References

Further reading
 

Consulting firms established in 1987
Companies based in San Francisco
1987 establishments in California
Futures studies organizations